Vilma Matthijs Holmberg (born 25 February 1999) is a Swedish handball player who plays for Thüringer HC and the Swedish national team.

She represented Sweden at the 2021 World Handball Championship.

Achievements 
Svensk handbollselit:
Winner: 2021
Silver Medalist: 2019

Swedish Handball Cup:
Winner: 2022

References

1999 births
Living people
Swedish female handball players
Handball players from Stockholm
21st-century Swedish women